A total solar eclipse occurred on September 21, 1903. A solar eclipse occurs when the Moon passes between Earth and the Sun, thereby totally or partly obscuring the image of the Sun for a viewer on Earth. A total solar eclipse occurs when the Moon's apparent diameter is larger than the Sun's, blocking all direct sunlight, turning day into darkness. Totality occurs in a narrow path across Earth's surface, with the partial solar eclipse visible over a surrounding region thousands of kilometres wide.

Related eclipses

Solar eclipses 1902–1907

Inex series 

In the 19th century:
 Solar Saros 120: Total Solar Eclipse of 1816 Nov 19
 Solar Saros 121: Hybrid Solar Eclipse of 1845 Oct 30
 Solar Saros 122: Annular Solar Eclipse of 1874 Oct 10

In the 22nd century:
 Solar Saros 130: Total Solar Eclipse of 2106 May 03
 Solar Saros 131: Annular Solar Eclipse of 2135 Apr 13
 Solar Saros 132: Hybrid Solar Eclipse of 2164 Mar 23
 Solar Saros 133: Total Solar Eclipse of 2193 Mar 03

Tritos series

Notes

References

1903 09 21
1903 in science
1903 09 21
September 1903 events